"Porn Star Dancing" is the debut  single by the Canadian rock band My Darkest Days from their self-titled debut album released on September 21, 2010. The single itself was released on June 21, 2010, preceding the release of the album by three months. The song spent 26 weeks on Billboards Rock Songs chart where, on December 11, 2010, it peaked at number seven. It performed better on the Billboard Mainstream Rock Tracks chart, where it spent two weeks at number one. Chad Kroeger of Nickelback sings a verse in the "Porn Star Dancing" video, which was filmed at the Hard Rock Hotel and Casino in Las Vegas, as does American rapper Ludacris, and Black Label Society frontman Zakk Wylde does a guitar solo. The music video was directed by Brendan Cochrane. Ludacris was originally featured only in the Canadian release of the video; however, due to the popularity of the track, it was subsequently adopted as the mainstream video and radio release.

Media appearances
It was featured in the 2013 episode of Blue Bloods called "Devil's Breath" (season 3, episode 21).

Charts

Year-end charts

Certifications

References

2010 debut singles
2010 songs
604 Records singles
Song recordings produced by Joey Moi
Songs written by Joey Moi
Songs written by Chad Kroeger
Songs written by Ted Bruner

2010 singles
My Darkest Days songs